Acanthocalycium thionanthum is a species of Acanthocalycium from Argentina.

Subspecies

References

External links
 
 

thionanthum
Flora of Argentina